This is a complete list of the currently existing buildings created in the Kievan Rus before the Mongol invasions of the 1230s. Almost all these buildings are churches: only three secular buildings survived from the period.

Most of the churches were completely rebuilt over the years and lost some essential features of the Old Rus architecture. Some were destroyed in the 20th century and then replicas were built years later. These churches are included in the list. Churches that were destroyed and subsequently rebuilt without any attempts of scientific reconstruction (the Assumption Church of Virgin Pirogoshcha and the Saint Michael Cathedral of St. Michael's Golden-Domed Monastery, both in Kyiv) are not included.

The list is organized geographically, roughly corresponding to the main principalities of the Kievan Rus. Inside these divisions, the entries are sorted by the date of the first creation.

Kiev Land

Chernigov Land

Pereyaslavl Land

Novgorod Land

Vladimir-Suzdal Land

Smolensk Land

Polotsk Land

Grodno Land

Volyn Land

Galich Land

References

Notes

Sources
 

Rus
Architecture in Russia
Architecture in Ukraine
Architecture in Belarus
Buildings
Pre-Mongol Rus
Pre-Mongol Rus